Bakka-Phoenix Science Fiction & Fantasy Bookstore is an independent bookstore in Toronto, Ontario, which specializes in science fiction and fantasy literature.

It was started on Toronto's then-bohemian Queen Street West in May 1972 as a combined science-fiction and comic book store called Bakka, a name taken by founding owner Charles McKee (born 1 December 1947) from a Fremen legend in Frank Herbert's novel Dune; Bakka was "the weeper who mourns for all mankind."  The comic-book business split off early on, becoming The Silver Snail, still extant and until recently located on the opposite side of Queen Street West.

Bakka published Bakka Magazine from 1975-77.

Bakka originally had a substantial stock of used, as well as new, books, but when the store moved to its 1998 location (see below), the reduced floorspace meant that emphasis shifted almost entirely to new books; with the November 2010 move, it is back to having a significant used-book section although the emphasis is still very much on new books. Unlike many other SF specialty stores, Bakka has remained almost exclusively a bookstore; it does not sell toys, games, comics, memorabilia, or collectibles.

The store moved in March 1998 to 598 Yonge Street in Toronto, the same building as the LGBT bookstore Glad Day, and relocated in March 2005 to 697 Queen Street West in Toronto. Robert J. Sawyer's 1998 novel Factoring Humanity, set early in the 21st century, "predicted" this move: 

In November 2010, the store moved again, this time to larger quarters at 84 Harbord Street, just west of Spadina Avenue and adjacent to the main campus of the University of Toronto, in the Harbord Village neighbourhood. The new building has a ground floor devoted to new books; a downstairs devoted to media tie-ins, related nonfiction, and used books; and an upstairs function room available for book-club meetings and the like.  Although the previous locations were rental sites, the store owns the Harbord Street building.

At the original location, the store styled its name as "Bakka: A Science Fiction Book Shoppe." The signage out front in later years there was a space mural by Toronto artist Kevin Davies. At the 697 Queen Street location, the store styled itself as "BakkaPhoenix Science Fiction & Fantasy Bookstore," with signage graphics by John Rose, owner of the store.  The signage at the 84 Harbord location, also with graphics by Rose, adds a hyphen and some redundancy to the name, styling it as  "Bakka-Phoenix Books: Science Fiction & Fantasy Bookstore."

Its third owner, Ben Freiman, bought the store in 2003 from Rose; he appended "Phoenix" to the store's name to mark the new ownership, although the clientele still mostly refer to the store as just "Bakka." Freiman made no changes to the staff; Christine Szego was manager until 2018. After retiring, she was replaced with Scott Dagostino, who left shortly into 2020. The current manager is Becca Lovatt.

Several noted Canadian science fiction and fantasy authors, starting with Robert J. Sawyer in 1982 and continuing with Tanya Huff, Cory Doctorow, and Nalo Hopkinson, have been employed by the store. In honor of the store's 30th anniversary, The Bakka Anthology, containing new stories by all of these writers with an introduction by Spider Robinson, was published in 2002.  The anthology was edited by Kristen Pederson Chew, and was the final volume released under the "Bakka Books" imprint, established by then-owner John Rose.

References

External links
 
 Toronto Star article

Independent bookstores of Canada
Shops in Toronto
Retail companies established in 1972